Maytown is an unincorporated community and census-designated place in Floyd County, Kentucky, United States.

Geography
Maytown is located west of the center of Floyd County, along the Right Fork of Beaver Creek, a tributary of the Levisa Fork. Kentucky Route 80 passes just east of the community, leading north  to Prestonsburg (via U.S. Route 23) and southwest  to Hazard.

Demographics

Notable people
Songwriter Paul Gilley (1929–1957) was born in Maytown.

References

Census-designated places in Floyd County, Kentucky
Census-designated places in Kentucky